Junior Bitner Tafili (born 5 November 2003) is a Samoan football and rugby player, who plays for Lupe o le Soaga and has represented Samoa internationally in the Samoa national under-17 football team and Samoa national under-20 rugby union team.

Tafili is from Magiagi. He played as a midfielder for Lupe o le Soaga in the 2020 OFC Champions League. In July 2018 he was selected for the Samoa national under-17 football team for the 2018 OFC U-16 Championship.

He won the golden glove in the Samoan national football league in both 2020, and 2021.

Rugby career
In 2021 he was selected for the Samoa under-18 national rugby team. In October 2022 he was selected for the Samoa national under-20 rugby union team for the 2022 Oceania Rugby Under 20 Championship.

References

Living people
Samoan footballers
Samoa youth international footballers
Samoan rugby union players